In art history, literature and cultural studies, Orientalism is the imitation or depiction of aspects in the Eastern world. These depictions are usually done by writers, designers, and artists from the Western world. In particular, Orientalist painting, depicting more specifically the Middle East, was one of the many specialisms of 19th-century academic art, and the literature of Western countries took a similar interest in Oriental themes.

Since the publication of Edward Said's Orientalism in 1978, much academic discourse has begun to use the term "Orientalism" to refer to a general patronizing Western attitude towards Middle Eastern, Asian, and North African societies. In Said's analysis, the West essentializes these societies as static and undeveloped—thereby fabricating a view of Oriental culture that can be studied, depicted, and reproduced in the service of imperial power. Implicit in this fabrication, writes Said, is the idea that Western society is developed, rational, flexible, and superior. This allows Western imagination to see "Eastern" cultures and people as both alluring and a threat to Western civilization.

Background

Etymology
Orientalism refers to the Orient, in reference and opposition to the Occident; the East and the West, respectively. The word Orient entered the English language as the Middle French orient. The root word oriēns, from the Latin Oriēns, has synonymous denotations: The eastern part of the world; the sky whence comes the sun; the east; the rising sun, etc.; yet the denotation changed as a term of geography.

In the "Monk's Tale" (1375), Geoffrey Chaucer wrote: "That they conquered many regnes grete / In the orient, with many a fair citee." The term orient refers to countries east of the Mediterranean Sea and Southern Europe. In In Place of Fear (1952), Aneurin Bevan used an expanded denotation of the Orient that comprehended East Asia: "the awakening of the Orient under the impact of Western ideas." Edward Said said that Orientalism "enables the political, economic, cultural and social domination of the West, not just during colonial times, but also in the present."

Art
In art history, the term Orientalism refers to the works of mostly 19th-century Western artists who specialized in Oriental subjects, produced from their travels in Western Asia, during the 19th century. In that time, artists and scholars were described as Orientalists, especially in France, where the dismissive use of the term "Orientalist" was made popular by the art critic Jules-Antoine Castagnary. Despite such social disdain for a style of representational art, the French Society of Orientalist Painters was founded in 1893, with Jean-Léon Gérôme as the honorary president; whereas in Britain, the term Orientalist identified "an artist."

The formation of the French Orientalist Painters Society changed the consciousness of practitioners towards the end of the 19th century, since artists could now see themselves as part of a distinct art movement. As an art movement, Orientalist painting is generally treated as one of the many branches of 19th-century academic art; however, many different styles of Orientalist art were in evidence. Art historians tend to identify two broad types of Orientalist artist: the realists who carefully painted what they observed and those who imagined Orientalist scenes without ever leaving the studio. French painters such as Eugène Delacroix (1798–1863) and Jean-Léon Gérôme (1824–1904) are widely regarded as the leading luminaries of the Orientalist movement.

Oriental studies

In the 18th and 19th centuries, the term Orientalist identified a scholar who specialized in the languages and literatures of the Eastern world. Among such scholars were officials of the East India Company, who said that the Arab culture, the Indian culture, and the Islamic cultures should be studied as equal to the cultures of Europe. Among such scholars is the philologist William Jones, whose studies of Indo-European languages established modern philology. Company rule in India favored Orientalism as a technique for developing and maintaining positive relations with the Indians—until the 1820s, when the influence of "anglicists" such as Thomas Babington Macaulay and John Stuart Mill led to the promotion of a Western-style education.

Additionally, Hebraism and Jewish studies gained popularity among British and German scholars in the 19th and 20th centuries. The academic field of Oriental studies, which comprehended the cultures of the Near East and the Far East, became the fields of Asian studies and Middle Eastern studies.

Critical studies

Edward Said
In his book Orientalism (1978), cultural critic Edward Said redefines the term Orientalism to describe a pervasive Western tradition—academic and artistic—of prejudiced outsider-interpretations of the Eastern world, which was shaped by the cultural attitudes of European imperialism in the 18th and 19th centuries. The thesis of Orientalism develops Antonio Gramsci's theory of cultural hegemony, and Michel Foucault's theorisation of discourse (the knowledge-power relation) to criticise the scholarly tradition of Oriental studies. Said criticised contemporary scholars who perpetuated the tradition of outsider-interpretation of Arabo-Islamic cultures, especially Bernard Lewis and Fouad Ajami. Furthermore, Said said that "The idea of representation is a theatrical one: the Orient is the stage on which the whole East is confined", and that the subject of learned Orientalists "is not so much the East itself as the East made known, and therefore less fearsome, to the Western reading public".

In the academy, the book Orientalism (1978) became a foundational text of post-colonial cultural studies. The analyses in Said's works are of Orientalism in European literature, especially French literature, and do not analyse visual art and Orientalist painting. In that vein, the art historian Linda Nochlin applied Said's methods of critical analysis to art, "with uneven results". Other scholars see Orientalist paintings as depicting a myth and a fantasy that didn't often correlate with reality.

There is also a critical trend within the Islamic world. In 2002 it was estimated that in Saudi Arabia alone some 200 books and 2000 articles discussing Orientalism had been penned by local or foreign scholars.

Soviet scholarship

From the Bolsháya sovétskaya entsiklopédiya (1951):

Reflecting the colonialist-racist worldview of the European and American bourgeoisie, from the very beginning bourgeois orientology diametrically opposed the civilizations of the so-called "West" with those of the "East" slanderously declaring that Asian peoples are racially inferior, somehow primordially backward, incapable of determining their own fates, and that they appeared only as history's objects rather than its subject.

In European architecture and design

The Moresque style of Renaissance ornament is a European adaptation of the Islamic arabesque that began in the late 15th century and was to be used in some types of work, such as bookbinding, until almost the present day. Early architectural use of motifs lifted from the Indian subcontinent is known as Indo-Saracenic Revival architecture. One of the earliest examples is the façade of Guildhall, London (1788–1789). The style gained momentum in the west with the publication of views of India by William Hodges, and William and Thomas Daniell from about 1795. Examples of "Hindoo" architecture are Sezincote House (c. 1805) in Gloucestershire, built for a nabob returned from Bengal, and the Royal Pavilion in Brighton.

Turquerie, which began as early as the late 15th century, continued until at least the 18th century, and included both the use of "Turkish" styles in the decorative arts, the adoption of Turkish costume at times, and interest in art depicting the Ottoman Empire itself. Venice, the traditional trading partner of the Ottomans, was the earliest centre, with France becoming more prominent in the 18th century.

Chinoiserie is the catch-all term for the fashion for Chinese themes in decoration in Western Europe, beginning in the late 17th century and peaking in waves, especially Rococo Chinoiserie, c. 1740–1770. From the Renaissance to the 18th century, Western designers attempted to imitate the technical sophistication of Chinese ceramics with only partial success. Early hints of Chinoiserie appeared in the 17th century in nations with active East India companies: England (the East India Company), Denmark (the Danish East India Company), the Netherlands (the Dutch East India Company) and France (the French East India Company). Tin-glazed pottery made at Delft and other Dutch towns adopted genuine Ming-era blue and white porcelain from the early 17th century. Early ceramic wares made at Meissen and other centers of true porcelain imitated Chinese shapes for dishes, vases and teawares (see Chinese export porcelain).

Pleasure pavilions in "Chinese taste" appeared in the formal parterres of late Baroque and Rococo German palaces, and in tile panels at Aranjuez near Madrid. Thomas Chippendale's mahogany tea tables and china cabinets, especially, were embellished with fretwork glazing and railings, c. 1753–70. Sober homages to early Xing scholars' furnishings were also naturalized, as the tang evolved into a mid-Georgian side table and squared slat-back armchairs that suited English gentlemen as well as Chinese scholars. Not every adaptation of Chinese design principles falls within mainstream "chinoiserie". Chinoiserie media included imitations of lacquer and painted tin (tôle) ware that imitated japanning, early painted wallpapers in sheets, and ceramic figurines and table ornaments. Small pagodas appeared on chimneypieces and full-sized ones in gardens. Kew has a magnificent Great Pagoda designed by William Chambers. The Wilhelma (1846) in Stuttgart is an example of Moorish Revival architecture. Leighton House, built for the artist Frederic Leighton, has a conventional facade but elaborate Arab-style interiors, including original Islamic tiles and other elements as well as Victorian Orientalizing work.

After 1860, Japonism, sparked by the importing of ukiyo-e, became an important influence in the western arts. In particular, many modern French artists such as Claude Monet and Edgar Degas were influenced by the Japanese style. Mary Cassatt, an American artist who worked in France, used elements of combined patterns, flat planes and shifting perspective of Japanese prints in her own images. The paintings of James Abbott McNeill Whistler's The Peacock Room demonstrated how he used aspects of Japanese tradition and are some of the finest works of the genre. California architects Greene and Greene were inspired by Japanese elements in their design of the Gamble House and other buildings.

Egyptian Revival architecture became popular in the early and mid-19th century and continued as a minor style into the early 20th century. Moorish Revival architecture began in the early 19th century in the German states and was particularly popular for building synagogues. Indo-Saracenic Revival architecture was a genre that arose in the late 19th century in the British Raj.

Orientalist art

Pre-19th century

Depictions of Islamic "Moors" and "Turks" (imprecisely named Muslim groups of southern Europe, North Africa and West Asia) can be found in Medieval, Renaissance, and Baroque art. In Biblical scenes in Early Netherlandish painting, secondary figures, especially Romans, were given exotic costumes that distantly reflected the clothes of the Near East. The Three Magi in Nativity scenes were an especial focus for this. In general art with Biblical settings would not be considered as Orientalist except where contemporary or historicist Middle Eastern detail or settings is a feature of works, as with some paintings by Gentile Bellini and others, and a number of 19th-century works. Renaissance Venice had a phase of particular interest in depictions of the Ottoman Empire in painting and prints. Gentile Bellini, who travelled to Constantinople and painted the Sultan, and Vittore Carpaccio were the leading painters. By then the depictions were more accurate, with men typically dressed all in white. The depiction of Oriental carpets in Renaissance painting sometimes draws from Orientalist interest, but more often just reflects the prestige these expensive objects had in the period.

Jean-Étienne Liotard (1702–1789) visited Istanbul and painted numerous pastels of Turkish domestic scenes; he also continued to wear Turkish attire for much of the time when he was back in Europe. The ambitious Scottish 18th-century artist Gavin Hamilton found a solution to the problem of using modern dress, considered unheroic and inelegant, in history painting by using Middle Eastern settings with Europeans wearing local costume, as travelers were advised to do. His huge James Dawkins and Robert Wood Discovering the Ruins of Palmyra (1758, now Edinburgh) elevates tourism to the heroic, with the two travelers wearing what look very like togas. Many travelers had themselves painted in exotic Eastern dress on their return, including Lord Byron, as did many who had never left Europe, including Madame de Pompadour. The growing French interest in exotic Oriental luxury and lack of liberty in the 18th century to some extent reflected a pointed analogy with France's own absolute monarchy. Byron's poetry was highly influential in introducing Europe to the heady cocktail of Romanticism in exotic Oriental settings which was to dominate 19th century Oriental art.

French Orientalism

French Orientalist painting was transformed by Napoleon's ultimately unsuccessful invasion of Egypt and Syria in 1798–1801, which stimulated great public interest in Egyptology, and was also recorded in subsequent years by Napoleon's court painters, especially Antoine-Jean Gros, although the Middle Eastern campaign was not one on which he accompanied the army. Two of his most successful paintings, Bonaparte Visiting the Plague Victims of Jaffa (1804) and Battle of Abukir (1806) focus on the Emperor, as he was by then, but include many Egyptian figures, as does the less effective Napoleon at the Battle of the Pyramids (1810). Anne-Louis Girodet de Roussy-Trioson's La Révolte du Caire (1810) was another large and prominent example. A well-illustrated Description de l'Égypte was published by the French Government in twenty volumes between 1809 and 1828, concentrating on antiquities.

Eugène Delacroix's first great success, The Massacre at Chios (1824) was painted before he visited Greece or the East, and followed his friend Théodore Géricault's The Raft of the Medusa in showing a recent incident in distant parts that had aroused public opinion. Greece was still fighting for independence from the Ottomans, and was effectively as exotic as the more Near Eastern parts of the empire. Delacroix followed up with Greece on the Ruins of Missolonghi (1827), commemorating a siege of the previous year, and The Death of Sardanapalus, inspired by Lord Byron, which although set in antiquity has been credited with beginning the mixture of sex, violence, lassitude and exoticism which runs through much French Orientalist painting. In 1832, Delacroix finally visited what is now Algeria, recently conquered by the French, and Morocco, as part of a diplomatic mission to the Sultan of Morocco. He was greatly struck by what he saw, comparing the North African way of life to that of the Ancient Romans, and continued to paint subjects from his trip on his return to France. Like many later Orientalist painters, he was frustrated by the difficulty of sketching women, and many of his scenes featured Jews or warriors on horses. However, he was apparently able to get into the women's quarters or harem of a house to sketch what became Women of Algiers; few later harem scenes had this claim to authenticity.

When Ingres, the director of the French Académie de peinture, painted a highly colored vision of a Turkish bath, he made his eroticized Orient publicly acceptable by his diffuse generalizing of the female forms (who might all have been the same model). More open sensuality was seen as acceptable in the exotic Orient. This imagery persisted in art into the early 20th century, as evidenced in Henri Matisse's orientalist semi-nudes from his Nice period, and his use of Oriental costumes and patterns. Ingres' pupil Théodore Chassériau (1819–1856) had already achieved success with his nude The Toilette of Esther (1841, Louvre) and equestrian portrait of Ali-Ben-Hamet, Caliph of Constantine and Chief of the Haractas, Followed by his Escort (1846) before he first visited the East, but in later decades the steamship made travel much easier and increasing numbers of artists traveled to the Middle East and beyond, painting a wide range of Oriental scenes.

In many of these works, artists portrayed the Orient as exotic, colorful and sensual, not to say stereotyped. Such works typically concentrated on Arab, Jewish, and other Semitic cultures, as those were the ones visited by artists as France became more engaged in North Africa. French artists such as Eugène Delacroix, Jean-Léon Gérôme and Jean-Auguste-Dominique Ingres painted many works depicting Islamic culture, often including lounging odalisques. They stressed both lassitude and visual spectacle. Other scenes, especially in genre painting, have been seen as either closely comparable to their equivalents set in modern-day or historical Europe, or as also reflecting an Orientalist mind-set in the Saidian sense of the term. Gérôme was the precursor, and often the master, of a number of French painters in the later part of the century whose works were often frankly salacious, frequently featuring scenes in harems, public baths and slave auctions (the last two also available with classical decor), and responsible, with others, for "the equation of Orientalism with the nude in pornographic mode"; (Gallery, below)

Orientalist sculptors include Charles Cordier.

British Orientalism

Though British political interest in the territories of the unravelling Ottoman Empire was as intense as in France, it was mostly more discreetly exercised. The origins of British Orientalist 19th-century painting owe more to religion than military conquest or the search for plausible locations for nude women. The leading British genre painter, Sir David Wilkie was 55 when he travelled to Istanbul and Jerusalem in 1840, dying off Gibraltar during the return voyage. Though not noted as a religious painter, Wilkie made the trip with a Protestant agenda to reform religious painting, as he believed that: "a Martin Luther in painting is as much called for as in theology, to sweep away the abuses by which our divine pursuit is encumbered", by which he meant traditional Christian iconography. He hoped to find more authentic settings and decor for Biblical subjects at their original location, though his death prevented more than studies being made. Other artists including the Pre-Raphaelite William Holman Hunt and David Roberts (in The Holy Land, Syria, Idumea, Arabia, Egypt, and Nubia) had similar motivations, giving an emphasis on realism in British Orientalist art from the start. The French artist James Tissot also used contemporary Middle Eastern landscape and decor for Biblical subjects, with little regard for historical costumes or other fittings.

William Holman Hunt produced a number of major paintings of Biblical subjects drawing on his Middle Eastern travels, improvising variants of contemporary Arab costume and furnishings to avoid specifically Islamic styles, and also some landscapes and genre subjects. The biblical subjects included The Scapegoat (1856), The Finding of the Saviour in the Temple (1860), and The Shadow of Death (1871). The Miracle of the Holy Fire (1899) was intended as a picturesque satire on the local Eastern Christians, of whom, like most European visitors, Hunt took a very dim view. His A Street Scene in Cairo; The Lantern-Maker's Courtship (1854–61) is a rare contemporary narrative scene, as the young man feels his fiancé's face, which he is not allowed to see, through her veil, as a Westerner in the background beats his way up the street with his stick. This a rare intrusion of a clearly contemporary figure into an Orientalist scene; mostly they claim the picturesqueness of the historical painting so popular at the time, without the trouble of researching authentic costumes and settings.

When Gérôme exhibited For Sale; Slaves at Cairo at the Royal Academy in London in 1871, it was "widely found offensive", partly because the British involvement in successfully suppressed the slave trade in Egypt, but also for cruelty and "representing fleshiness for its own sake". But Rana Kabbani believes that "French Orientalist painting, as exemplified by the works of Gérôme, may appear more sensual, gaudy, gory and sexually explicit than its British counterpart, but this is a difference of style not substance ... Similar strains of fascination and repulsion convulsed their artists" Nonetheless, nudity and violence are more evident in British paintings set in the ancient world, and "the iconography of the odalisque ... the Oriental sex slave whose image is offered up to the viewer as freely as she herself supposedly was to her master – is almost entirely French in origin", though taken up with enthusiasm by Italian and other European painters.

John Frederick Lewis, who lived for several years in a traditional mansion in Cairo, painted highly detailed works showing both realistic genre scenes of Middle Eastern life and more idealized scenes in upper class Egyptian interiors with no traces of Western cultural influence yet apparent. His careful and seemingly affectionate representation of Islamic architecture, furnishings, screens, and costumes set new standards of realism, which influenced other artists, including Gérôme in his later works. He "never painted a nude", and his wife modelled for several of his harem scenes, which, with the rare examples by the classicist painter Lord Leighton, imagine "the harem as a place of almost English domesticity, ... [where]... women's fully clothed respectability suggests a moral healthiness to go with their natural good looks".

Other artists concentrated on landscape painting, often of desert scenes, including Richard Dadd and Edward Lear. David Roberts (1796–1864) produced architectural and landscape views, many of antiquities, and published very successful books of lithographs from them.

Russian Orientalism

Russian Orientalist art was largely concerned with the areas of Central Asia that Russia was conquering during the century, and also in historical painting with the Mongols who had dominated Russia for much of the Middle Ages, who were rarely shown in a good light. The explorer Nikolai Przhevalsky played a major role in popularising an exotic view of "the Orient" and advocating imperial expansion.

"The Five" Russian composers were prominent 19th-century Russian composers who worked together to create a distinct national style of classical music. One hallmark of "The Five" composers was their reliance on orientalism. Many quintessentially "Russian" works were composed in orientalist style, such as Balakirev's Islamey, Borodin's Prince Igor and Rimsky-Korsakov's Scheherazade. As leader of "The Five," Balakirev encouraged the use of eastern themes and harmonies to set their "Russian" music apart from the German symphonism of Anton Rubinstein and other Western-oriented composers.

German Orientalism 
Edward Said originally wrote that Germany did not have a politically motivated Orientalism because its colonial empire did not expand in the same areas as France and Britain. Said later stated that Germany "had in common with Anglo-French and later American Orientalism [...] a kind of intellectual authority over the Orient," However, Said also wrote that "there was nothing in Germany to correspond to the Anglo-French presence in India, the Levant, North Africa. Moreover, the German Orient was almost exclusively a scholarly, or at least a classical, Orient: it was made the subject of lyrics, fantasies, and even novels, but it was never actual." According to Suzanne L. Marchand, German scholars were the "pace-setters" in oriental studies. Robert Irwin wrote that "until the outbreak of the Second World War, German dominance of Orientalism was practically unchallenged."

Elsewhere 
Nationalist historical painting in Central Europe and the Balkans dwelt on oppression during the Ottoman Empire period, battles between Ottoman and Christian armies, as well as themes like the Ottoman Imperial Harem, although the latter was a less common theme than in French depictions.

The Saidian analysis has not prevented a strong revival of interest in, and collecting of, 19th century Orientalist works since the 1970s, the latter was in large part led by Middle Eastern buyers.

Pop culture

Authors and composers are not commonly referred to as "Orientalist" in the way that artists are, and relatively few specialized in Oriental topics or styles, or are even best known for their works including them. But many major figures, from Mozart to Flaubert, have produced significant works with Oriental subjects or treatments. Lord Byron with his four long "Turkish tales" in poetry, is one of the most important writers to make exotic fantasy Oriental settings a significant theme in the literature of Romanticism. Giuseppe Verdi's opera Aida (1871) is set in Egypt as portrayed through the content and the visual spectacle. "Aida" depicts a militaristic Egypt's tyranny over Ethiopia.

Irish Orientalism had a particular character, drawing on various beliefs about early historical links between Ireland and the East, few of which are now regarded as historically correct. The mythical Milesians are one example of this. The Irish were also conscious of the views of other nations seeing them as comparably backward to the East, and Europe's "backyard Orient."

In music

In music, Orientalism may be applied to styles occurring in different periods, such as the alla Turca, used by multiple composers including Mozart and Beethoven. The musicologist Richard Taruskin identified in 19th-century Russian music a strain of Orientalism: "the East as a sign or metaphor, as imaginary geography, as historical fiction, as the reduced and totalized other against which we construct our (not less reduced and totalized) sense of ourselves." Taruskin conceded Russian composers, unlike those in France and Germany, felt an "ambivalence" to the theme since "Russia was a contiguous empire in which Europeans, living side by side with 'orientals', identified (and intermarried) with them far more than in the case of other colonial powers".

Nonetheless, Taruskin characterized Orientalism in Romantic Russian music as having melodies "full of close little ornaments and melismas," chromatic accompanying lines, drone bass—characteristics which were used by Glinka, Balakirev, Borodin, Rimsky-Korsakov, Lyapunov, and Rachmaninov. These musical characteristics evoke:not just the East, but the seductive East that emasculates, enslaves, renders passive. In a word, it signifies the promise of the experience of nega, a prime attribute of the orient as imagined by the Russians.... In opera and song, nega often simply denotes S-E-X a la russe, desired or achieved.Orientalism is also traceable in music that is considered to have effects of exoticism, including the Japonisme in Claude Debussy's piano music all the way to the sitar being used in recordings by the Beatles.

In the United Kingdom, Gustav Holst composed Beni Mora evoking a languid, heady Arabian atmosphere.

Orientalism, in a more camp fashion also found its way into exotica music in the late 1950s, especially the works of Les Baxter, for example, his composition "City of Veils."

In literature

The Romantic movement in literature began in 1785 and ended around 1830. The term Romantic references the ideas and culture that writers of the time reflected in their work. During this time, the culture and objects of the East began to have a profound effect on Europe. Extensive traveling by artists and members of the European elite brought travelogues and sensational tales back to the West creating a great interest in all things "foreign." Romantic Orientalism incorporates African and Asian geographic locations, well-known colonial and "native" personalities, folklore, and philosophies to create a literary environment of colonial exploration from a distinctly European worldview. The current trend in analysis of this movement references a belief in this literature as a mode to justify European colonial endeavors with the expansion of territory.

In his novel Salammbô, Gustave Flaubert used ancient Carthage in North Africa as a foil to ancient Rome. He portrayed its culture as morally corrupting and suffused with dangerously alluring eroticism. This novel proved hugely influential on later portrayals of ancient Semitic cultures.

In film

Said argues that the continuity of Orientalism into the present can be found in influential images, particularly through the Cinema of the United States, as the West has now grown to include the United States. Many blockbuster feature films, such as the Indiana Jones series, The Mummy films, and Disney's Aladdin film series demonstrate the imagined geographies of the East. The films usually portray the lead heroic characters as being from the Western world, while the villains often come from the East. The representation of the Orient has continued in film, although this representation does not necessarily have any truth to it.
In The Tea House of the August Moon (1956), as argued by Pedro Iacobelli, there are tropes of orientalism. He notes, that the film "tells us more about the Americans and the American's image of Okinawa rather than about the Okinawan people." The film characterizes the Okinawans as "merry but backward" and "de-politicized," which ignored the real-life Okinawan political protests over forceful land acquisition by the American military at the time.

Kimiko Akita, in Orientalism and the Binary of Fact and Fiction in 'Memoirs of a Geisha, argues that Memoirs of a Geisha (2005) contains orientalist tropes and deep "cultural misrepresentations." She states that Memoirs of a Geisha "reinforces the idea of Japanese culture and geisha as exotic, backward, irrational, dirty, profane, promiscuous, bizarre, and enigmatic."

In dance
During the Romantic period of the 19th century, ballet developed a preoccupation with the exotic. This exoticism ranged from ballets set in Scotland to those based on ethereal creatures. By the later part of the century, ballets were capturing the presumed essence of the mysterious East. These ballets often included sexual themes and tended to be based on assumptions of people rather than on concrete facts. Orientalism is apparent in numerous ballets.

The Orient motivated several major ballets, which have survived since the late nineteenth and early twentieth centuries. Le Corsaire premiered in 1856 at the Paris Opera, with choreography by Joseph Mazilier. Marius Petipa re-choreographed the ballet for the Maryinsky Ballet in St. Petersburg, Russia in 1899. Its complex storyline, loosely based on Lord Byron's poem, takes place in Turkey and focuses on a love story between a pirate and a beautiful slave girl. Scenes include a bazaar where women are sold to men as slaves, and the Pasha's Palace, which features his harem of wives. In 1877, Marius Petipa choreographed La Bayadère, the love story of an Indian temple dancer and Indian warrior. This ballet was based on Kalidasa's play Sakuntala. La Bayadere used vaguely Indian costuming, and incorporated Indian inspired hand gestures into classical ballet. In addition, it included a 'Hindu Dance,' motivated by Kathak, an Indian dance form. Another ballet, Sheherazade, choreographed by Michel Fokine in 1910 to music by Nikolai Rimsky-Korsakov, is a story involving a shah's wife and her illicit relations with a Golden Slave, originally played by Vaslav Nijinsky. The ballet's controversial fixation on sex includes an orgy in an oriental harem. When the shah discovers the actions of his numerous wives and their lovers, he orders the deaths of those involved. Sheherazade was loosely based on folktales of questionable authenticity.

Several lesser-known ballets of the late nineteenth and early twentieth century also show their Orientalism. For instance, in Petipa's The Pharaoh's Daughter (1862), an Englishman imagines himself, in an opium-induced dream, as an Egyptian boy who wins the love of the Pharaoh's daughter, Aspicia. Aspicia's costume consisted of 'Egyptian' décor on a tutu. Another ballet, Hippolyte Monplaisir's Brahma, which premiered in 1868 in La Scala, Italy, is a story that involves romantic relations between a slave girl and Brahma, the Hindu god, when he visits earth. In addition, in 1909, Serge Diagilev included Cléopâtre in the Ballets Russes' repertory. With its theme of sex, this revision of Fokine's Une Nuit d'Egypte combined the "exoticism and grandeur" that audiences of this time craved.

As one of the pioneers of modern dance in America, Ruth St Denis also explored Orientalism in her dancing. Her dances were not authentic; she drew inspiration from photographs, books, and later from museums in Europe. Yet, the exoticism of her dances catered to the interests of society women in America. She included Radha and The Cobras in her 'Indian' program in 1906. In addition, she found success in Europe with another Indian-themed ballet, The Nautch in 1908. In 1909, upon her return to America, St Denis created her first 'Egyptian' work, Egypta. Her preference for Orientalism continued, culminating with Ishtar of the Seven Gates in 1923, about a Babylonian goddess.

While Orientalism in dance climaxed in the late nineteenth and early twentieth centuries, it is still present in modern times. For instance, major ballet companies regularly perform Le Corsaire, La Bayadere, and Sheherazade. Furthermore, Orientalism is also found within newer versions of ballets. In versions of The Nutcracker, such as the 2010 American Ballet Theatre production, the Chinese dance uses an arm position with the arms bent at a ninety-degree angle and the index fingers pointed upwards, while the Arabian dance uses two dimensional bent arm movements. Inspired by ballets of the past, stereotypical 'Oriental' movements and arm positions have developed and remain.

Religion

An exchange of Western and Eastern ideas about spirituality developed as the West traded with and established colonies in Asia. The first Western translation of a Sanskrit text appeared in 1785, marking the growing interest in Indian culture and languages. Translations of the Upanishads, which Arthur Schopenhauer called "the consolation of my life", first appeared in 1801 and 1802. Early translations also appeared in other European languages. 19th-century transcendentalism was influenced by Asian spirituality, prompting Ralph Waldo Emerson (1803–1882) to pioneer the idea of spirituality as a distinct field.

A major force in the mutual influence of Eastern and Western spirituality and religiosity was the Theosophical Society, a group searching for ancient wisdom from the East and spreading Eastern religious ideas in the West. One of its salient features was the belief in "Masters of Wisdom", "beings, human or once human, who have transcended the normal frontiers of knowledge, and who make their wisdom available to others". The Theosophical Society also spread Western ideas in the East, contributing to its modernisation and a growing nationalism in the Asian colonies.

The Theosophical Society had a major influence on Buddhist modernism and Hindu reform movements. Between 1878 and 1882, the Society and the Arya Samaj were united as the Theosophical Society of the Arya Samaj. Helena Blavatsky, along with H. S. Olcott and Anagarika Dharmapala, was instrumental in the Western transmission and revival of Theravada Buddhism.

Another major influence was Vivekananda, who popularised his modernised interpretation of Advaita Vedanta during the later 19th and early 20th century in both India and the West, emphasising anubhava ("personal experience") over scriptural authority.

 Islam 
With the spread of Eastern religious and cultural ideals towards the West, came in with studies and certain illustrations that depicts certain regions and religions under the Western perspective. Many the aspects or views are often turned into the ideas that the West have adopted onto those cultural and religious ideals. One of the more adopted views can be depicted through Western context on Islam and the Middle East. Under the adopted view of Islam under the Western context, Orientalism falls under the category of the Western perspective of thinking that shifts through social constructs that refers towards representations of the religion or culture in a subjective view point. The concept of Orientalism dates back to precolonial eras, as the main European powers acquired and perceived of territory, resources, knowledge, and control of the regions in the East. The term Orientalism, depicts further into the historical context of antagonism and misrepresentation into the tendencies of a growing layer of Western inclusion and influence on foreign culture and ideals.

In the religious perspective under Islam, the term Orientalism applies in similar meaning as the outlook from the Western perspective, mainly in the eyes of the Christian majority. The main contributor of the depiction of Oriental perspectives or illustrations on Islam and other Middle Eastern cultures derives from the imperial and colonial influences and powers that attribute to formation of multiple fields of geographical, political, educational, and scientific elements. The combination of these different genres reveal significant division among people of those cultures and reinforces the ideals set from the Western perspective. With Islam, historically scientific discoveries, research, inventions, or ideas that were presented before and contributed to many other European breakthroughs are not affiliated with the previous Islamic scientists.  From the exclusion of past contributions and initial works further lead to narrative of the concept of Orientalism with the passing of time generated a history and directive of presence within region and religion that historically influences the image of the East.

Through the recent years, Orientalism has been influenced and shirted to altering representations of various forms that all derive from the same meaning.  From the nineteenth century, among the Western perspectives on Orientalism, differed as the split of American and European Orientalism viewed different illustrations. With mainstream media and popular production reveal many depictions of Oriental cultures and Islamic references to the current event of radicalization for Non-western cultures. With references and mainstream media often utilized to contribute to an extended agenda under the construct judgement of alternate motives. The approach with the generalization of the term Orientalism was embedded with under beginning of colonialism as the root of the main complexity of within modern societies perspectives of foreign cultures. As mainstream media depicts illustrations to utilize many instances of discourse and on certain regions mainly among the conflict within regions in the Middle East and Africa.  With agenda of influencing views on non-western societies to be deemed non-compatible with differing ideologies and cultures, the elements that present diversion among Eastern societies and aspects.

Eastern views of the West and Western views of the East
The concept of Orientalism has been adopted by scholars in East-Central and Eastern Europe, among them Maria Todorova, Attila Melegh, Tomasz Zarycki, and Dariusz Skórczewski as an analytical tool for exploring the images of East-Central and Eastern European societies in cultural discourses of the West in the 19th century and during the Soviet domination.

The term "re-orientalism'''" was used by Lisa Lau and Ana Cristina Mendes to refer to how Eastern self-representation is based on western referential points:Re-Orientalism differs from Orientalism in its manner of and reasons for referencing the West: while challenging the metanarratives of Orientalism, re-Orientalism sets up alternative metanarratives of its own in order to articulate eastern identities, simultaneously deconstructing and reinforcing Orientalism.

 Occidentalism 

The term occidentalism is often used to refer to negative views of the Western world found in Eastern societies, and is founded on the sense of nationalism that spread in reaction to colonialism (see Pan-Asianism). Edward Said has been accused of Occidentalizing the west in his critique of Orientalism; of being guilty of falsely characterizing the West in the same way that he accuses Western scholars of falsely characterizing the East. Said essentialized the West by creating a homogenous image of the area. Currently, the West consists not only of Europe, but also the United States and Canada, which have become more influential over the years.

18th century Qing emperors in China had a material fascination with Occidenterie, or objects inspired by Western art and architecture (an analogue to Europe's chinoiserie or material imitation of Chinese artistic traditions). Although the phenomenon was strongly associated with the emperor's court and the architecture project of Xiyang Lou, nonetheless, a wide spectrum of China's social classes had some access to Occidenterie objects as they were domestically produced.

 Othering 
The action of othering cultures occurs when groups are labeled as different due to characteristics that distinguish them from the perceived norm. Edward Said, author of the book Orientalism, argued that western powers and influential individuals such as social scientists and artists othered "the Orient." The evolution of ideologies is often initially embedded in the language, and continues to ripple through the fabric of society by taking over the culture, economy and political sphere. Much of Said's criticism of Western Orientalism is based on what he describes as articularizing trends. These ideologies are present in Asian works by Indian, Chinese, and Japanese writers and artists, in their views of Western culture and tradition. A particularly significant development is the manner in which Orientalism has taken shape in non-Western cinema, as for instance in Hindi-language cinema.

See also

 Allosemitism
 Arabist
 Black orientalism
 Borealism
 Chinoiserie
 Cultural appropriation
 Dahesh Museum
 Ethnocentrism
 Exoticism
 Hebraist
 Hellenocentrism
 Indomania
 Japonisme
 La belle juive
 List of artistic works with Orientalist influences
 List of Orientalist artists
 Neo-orientalism
 Noble savage
 Objectification
 Othering
 Outsider art
 Pizza effect
 Primitivism
 Racial fetishism
 Romantic racism
 Soviet Orientalist studies in Islam
 Stereotypes of Arabs and Muslims in the United States
 Stereotypes of Jews
 Stereotypes of South Asians
 Turquerie
 Westsplaining
 World music
 Xenocentrism

Notes

References

Sources

 Beard, David and Kenneth Gloag. 2005. Musicology: The Key Concepts. New York: Routledge.
 Cristofi, Renato Brancaglione. Architectural Orientalism in São Paulo - 1895 - 1937. 2016. São Paulo: University of São Paulo online, accessed July 11, 2018
 
 Harding, James, Artistes Pompiers: French Academic Art in the 19th Century, 1979, Academy Editions, 
 C F Ives, "The Great Wave: The Influence of Japanese Woodcuts on French Prints", 1974, The Metropolitan Museum of Art, 
 Gabriel, Karen & P.K. Vijayan (2012): Orientalism, terrorism and Bombay cinema, Journal of Postcolonial Writing, 48:3, 299–310
 
 
 Holloway, Steven W., ed. (2006). Orientalism, Assyriology and the Bible. Hebrew Bible Monographs, 10. Sheffield Phoenix Press, 2006. 
 
 King, Donald and Sylvester, David eds. The Eastern Carpet in the Western World, From the 15th to the 17th century, Arts Council of Great Britain, London, 1983, 
 
 Mack, Rosamond E. Bazaar to Piazza: Islamic Trade and Italian Art, 1300–1600, University of California Press, 2001 
 
 Meagher, Jennifer. Orientalism in Nineteenth-Century Art. In Heilbrunn Timeline of Art History. New York: The Metropolitan Museum of Art, 2000–. online, accessed April 11, 2011
 
 Nochlin, Linda, The Imaginary Orient, 1983, page numbers from reprint in The nineteenth-century visual culture reader,google books, a reaction to Rosenthal's exhibition and book.
 
 
 Said, Edward W. Orientalism. New York: Pantheon Books, 1978 ).
 
 
 Taruskin, Richard. Defining Russia Musically. Princeton University Press, 1997 .
 Tromans, Nicholas, and others, The Lure of the East, British Orientalist Painting, 2008, Tate Publishing, 

Further reading
Art
 Alazard, Jean. L'Orient et la peinture française.
 Behdad, Ali. 2013. Photography's Orientalism: New Essays on Colonial Representation. Getty Publications. 224 pages.
 Benjamin, Roger. 2003. Orientalist Aesthetics, Art, Colonialism and French North Africa: 1880–1930. University of California Press.
 Peltre, Christine. 1998. Orientalism in Art. New York: Abbeville Publishing Group. .
 Rosenthal, Donald A. 1982. Orientalism: The Near East in French Painting, 1800–1880. Rochester, NY: Memorial Art Gallery, University of Rochester.
 Stevens, Mary Anne, ed. 1984. The Orientalists: Delacroix to Matisse: European Painters in North Africa and the Near East (exhibition catalogue). London: Royal Academy of Arts.

Literature
 Balagangadhara, S. N. 2012. Reconceptualizing India studies. New Delhi: Oxford University Press.
 Bessis, Sophie (2003). Western Supremacy: The Triumph of an Idea?.  Zed Books.   

 Clarke, J. J. 1997. "Oriental Enlightenment." London: Routledge.
 Chatterjee, Indrani. 1999. "Gender, Slavery and Law in Colonial India." Oxford University Press.
 Frank, Andre Gunder. 1998. "ReOrient: Global Economy in the Asian Age." University of California Press.
 Halliday, Fred. 1993. "'Orientalism' and its critics." British Journal of Middle Eastern Studies 20(2):145–63. .
 Inden, Ronald. 2000. "Imagining India." Indiana University Press.
 Irwin, Robert. 2006. For lust of knowing: The Orientalists and their enemies. London: Penguin/Allen Lane. .
 Isin, Engin, ed. 2015. Citizenship After Orientalism: Transforming Political Theory. Basingstoke: Palgrave Macmillan.
 Kabbani, Rana. 1994. Imperial Fictions: Europe's Myths of Orient. London: Pandora Press. .
 Van der Pijl, Kees (2014). The Discipline of Western Supremacy: Modes of Foreign Relations and Political Economy, Volume III, Pluto Press, 
 King, Richard. 1999. "Orientalism and Religion." Routledge.
 Kontje, Todd. 2004. German Orientalisms. Ann Arbor, MI: University of Michigan Press. .
 Lach, Donald, and Edwin Van Kley. 1993. "Asia in the Making of Europe. Volume III." University of Chicago Press.
 Lindqvist, Sven (1996). Exterminate all the brutes.  New Press, New York.  .
 Little, Douglas. 2002. American Orientalism: The United States and the Middle East Since 1945. (2nd ed.) .
 Lowe, Lisa. 1992. Critical Terrains: French and British Orientalisms. Ithaca: Cornell University Press. .
 Macfie, Alexander Lyon. 2002. Orientalism. White Plains, NY: Longman. .
 MacKenzie, John. 1995. Orientalism: History, theory and the arts. Manchester: Manchester University Press. .
 McEvilley, Thomas. 2002. "The Shape of Ancient Thought: Comparative Studies in Greek and Indian Philosophies." New York: Allworth Press.
 Murti, Kamakshi P. 2001. India: The Seductive and Seduced "Other" of German Orientalism. Westport, CT: Greenwood Press. .
 Oueijan, Naji. 1996. The Progress of an Image: The East in English Literature. New York: Peter Lang Publishers.
 Skórczewski, Dariusz. 2020. Polish Literature and National Identity: A Postcolonial Perspective. Rochester: University of Rochester Press. .
 Steiner, Evgeny, ed. 2012. Orientalism/Occidentalism: Languages of Cultures vs. Languages of Description''. Moscow: Sovpadenie. [English & Russian]. .

External links

 The Orientalist Painters
 Arab world in art
 Arab women in art

 
Admiration of foreign cultures
Art history
Cultural appropriation
Eurocentrism
Pejorative terms
Orientalist painters
History of racism in the cinema of the United States